Khevid Jan (also Romanized as Khevīd Jān and Khavīd Jān) is a village in Ahmadabad Rural District, in the Central District of Firuzabad County, Fars Province, Iran. At the 2006 census, its population was 864, consisting of 187 families.

References 

Populated places in Firuzabad County